Mark Booth may refer to:

 Mark Booth, British author whose nom de plume is Jonathan Black
 Mark L. Booth (1911–1988), American football coach
 Mark Bell-Booth, New Zealand politician
 Mark Haworth-Booth (born 1944), British curator